Charles Brand may refer to:

Charles Brand (general) (1873–1961), Australian Army brigadier-general in World War I
Charles Hillyer Brand (1861–1933), American politician, businessman, jurist and lawyer
Charles Brand (Ohio politician) (1871–1966), U.S. Representative from Ohio
Charles Brand of Dundee, a firm of housebreakers
Charles Amarin Brand (1920–2013), French prelate of the Roman Catholic Church
Charles John Brand (1879–1949), United States Department of Agriculture official
Charles Brand (water polo) (1916–1984), British Olympic water polo player